Sanchidrián is a municipality located in the province of Ávila, Castile and León, Spain. According to the 2006 census (INE), the municipality has a population of 773 inhabitants. It is one of the most important towns in the comarca of la Moraña, and is the birthplace of the composer Tomás Luis de Victoria.

References

Municipalities in the Province of Ávila